The Metals Disintegrating Company manufactured metal powders such as aluminum powder. It was founded in 1916 by Everett Joel Hall (1879–1931), a professor of assaying at Columbia University. It was acquired by Alcan in 1963 and renamed as Alcan Powders and Pigments.  The aluminium powder business was separated and is now part of Toyal America while the copper-based powder business continued as ACuPowder International

References

American companies established in 1916 
Defunct companies based in New Jersey
Alcan
1916 establishments in New Jersey
Manufacturing companies based in New Jersey